was a large minelayer of the Imperial Japanese Navy (IJN), which was in service during the early stages of World War II. She was named after the Okinoshima Island in the Sea of Japan. She was the largest purpose-built minelayer in the IJN and the first Japanese minelayer to be equipped with a reconnaissance seaplane.

Building
A replacement was budgeted under the Maru-1 Supplementary Naval Expansion Budget of 1931. The new vessel was to be of unprecedented size, thus overcoming the shortcomings of previous minelayers in the Japanese inventory in terms of range and capacity.

Okinoshima was launched by the Harima Shipyards (now part of IHI Corporation) in Hyōgo Prefecture, Japan on November 14, 1935, and was commissioned into service on 30 September 1936.

Operational history
During the late 1930s, Okinoshima was assigned as flagship of a destroyer squadron, and made numerous survey missions to the Marshall Islands, Caroline Islands and Marianas in the Japanese South Seas Mandate, seeking potential sites for seaplane bases, and transporting naval mines for future use.

At the time of the attack on Pearl Harbor in December 1941, Okinoshima was serving as flagship for Admiral Kiyohide Shima in Operation Gi (the invasion of the Gilbert Islands) and had deployed from Jaluit with a Special Naval Landing Force (SNLF) embarked. From 9–10 December, Okinoshima supported the Japanese landings on Makin and on Tarawa, and on 24 December, the seizure of Abaiang. Okinoshima was at Truk on 1 January 1942.

In January 1942, under the overall command of Admiral Sadamichi Kajioka, Okinoshima  participated in "Operation R" (the invasion of Rabaul) landing Japanese troops at Blanche Bay, Rabaul on the night of 22/23 January 1942. On 1 February, Okinoshima was officially reassigned to the South Seas Force.

On 5 March, Okinoshima, under the overall command of Admiral Kuninori Marumo, was assigned to "Operation SR" (the invasion of Lae and Salamaua in New Guinea).

After repairs at Truk, on 28 April Okinoshima was appointed flagship for Admiral Shima's Tulagi invasion force, which was part of "Operation Mo" (the invasion of Tulagi and Port Moresby in New Guinea). The Tulagi assault force began their landings on Tulagi on 3 May, with Okinoshima successfully landing troops of the Kure 3rd SNLF. However, the invasion force was attacked on 4 May by aircraft from the USS Yorktown. Several transports and the destroyer  were sunk and Okinoshima suffered from a near miss, which resulted in her being towed to Rabaul for repairs.

Fate
On 10 May, Okinoshima departed Rabaul as part of "Operation RY", the invasion of Nauru and Ocean Island. On 12 May 1942, off New Ireland, she was hit by two or three torpedoes from the American submarine USS S-42. Okinoshima was taken under tow by the escorting destroyer , but capsized in St. George's Channel, in the Bismarck Sea at position . Most of the crew survived.  
Okinoshima was removed from the navy list on 25 May 1942.

References

Notes

Books

External links

Minelayers of the Imperial Japanese Navy
World War II mine warfare vessels of Japan
Ships built by IHI Corporation
1935 ships
Maritime incidents in May 1942
Shipwrecks in the Bismarck Sea
Ships sunk by American submarines